Mobeni is a suburb of Durban in KwaZulu-Natal, South Africa and forms part of the heavily industrialised South Durban Basin, a sub-region south of Durban.

Subdivisions 
Mobeni is a collective of three suburbs that lie between Chatsworth and the Bluff, namely the industrial suburbs of Mobeni East and Mobeni West and the residential suburb of Mobeni Heights. Mobeni Heights lies west of the N2 highway on the M1 (Higginson Highway), Mobeni West lies between the N2 and R102 (South Coast Road) and Mobeni East lies between the M4 highway and Jacobs.

Location 
Mobeni is located approximately 9 km south-west of Durban's Central Business District (CBD). It is located in a strategic location between two highways, the N2 to the east and the M4. The N2 links to King Shaka International Airport and KwaDukuza in the north and Amanzimtoti and Port Shepstone in the south whilst the M4 links to the Durban CBD in the north-east and the N2, Umlazi and Isipingo in the south-west.

It is bordered by Clairwood to the north, the Bluff to the east, Reunion to the south, Chatsworth to the south-west and Woodlands and Montclair to the west.

References 

Populated places in eThekwini Metropolitan Municipality